The Rublyovo-Uspenskoye Highway, designated as A106, is a Russian federal highway that runs from Moscow to Zvenigorod. It starts at the Rublevsky Highway at the intersection with the Moscow Ring Road, runs along the Moskva river and ends near Zvenigorod.

The Rublyovo-Uspenskoye Highway is a highway with improved surface. The road is maintained by the 7th District of the GIBDD.

References

Roads in Moscow
Roads in Moscow Oblast